{{DISPLAYTITLE:C22H28O2}}
The molecular formula C22H28O2 may refer to:

 Etonogestrel, a progestin medication used as birth control for women
 Methenmadinone, a pregnane steroid which was never marketed

Molecular formulas